OROM or Orom may refer to:

 Option ROM, in PCs
 Optical read only memory, a type of computer memory
 Orom (Kanjiža), a village in Serbia
 Horom, Armenia, also called Orom
 Oromë, a fictional character.